The Iran Khodro Stadium is a multi-purpose stadium in Karaj, Iran.  It is currently used mostly for football matches and is the home stadium of Paykan Qazvin F.C. The stadium holds 10,000 people. 

Football venues in Iran
Multi-purpose stadiums in Iran
Karaj
Sport in Alborz Province